George Gay may refer to:

George H. Gay Jr. (1917–1994), American World War II pilot
George K. Gay (1810–1882), Oregon pioneer who participated in the Provisional Government
Georges Gay (1926–1997), French cyclist
George Gay was a lynching victim in Texas on December 11, 1922